The  Changjiang Water Resources Commission (CWRC) is a river basin authority dispatched by the Ministry of Water Resources of the People's Republic of China to exercise water administrative functions in the Yangtze River Basin and other river basins of southwestern China (west to and inclusive of the Lancang River). As the legacy of the former Yangtze River Water Resources Commission that existed before founding of the People's Republic of China, the CWRC was re-established in February 1950 with its headquarters seated in Wuhan. In accordance with national legislature and the authorization from the Ministry of Water Resources, the CWRC is responsible for water administration and law enforcement, integrated water resources management (including water conserving, allocation and protection), basin planning, flood control and drought relief, river course management, key hydraulic project construction and management, river sand extraction management, soil conservation, hydrology, scientific research as well as operation and stewardship of State owned assets.

Organization

Administrative agencies
Executive Office
Office of Chief Engineers
Bureau of Planning and Programming
Bureau of Water Administration and Water Resources (Corps of Water Administrative Supervision)
Bureau of International Cooperation, Science and Technology
Bureau of Finance and Economy
Bureau of Personnel, Labor and Education
Bureau of Yangtze River Sand Extraction Management
Bureau of Soil and Water Conservation
Office of Yangtze River Flood Control (Bureau of River Management)
Bureau of Project Construction and Management
Bureau of Censorship
Bureau of Audit
Bureau of Retirees Service
Labor Union Yangtze Branch

Special establishments
Bureau of Yangtze Basin Water Resource Protection

Institutions
Bureau of Hydrology
Changjiang River Scientific Research Institute 
Institute of Ecological Studies for Water Project
Bureau of Yangtze Engineering Construction
Bureau of Lushui Experimental Hydropower Complex Management
Yangtze Institute of Geotechnique and Survey
Comprehensive Management Center
Network and Information Center
Communication and Publishing Center (Yangtze Press)
Human Resource Development Center
Logistics Center (Bureau)
Central Station of Yangtze Basin Soil and Water Conservation Monitoring
Yangtze Hospital (Schistosomiasis Prevention and Monitoring Center)
Post of Liaison in Beijing

Enterprises
General Corporation of Changjiang Water and Hydropower Development
Changjiang Institute of Survey, Planning, Design and Research
Hanjiang River Water and Hydropower Group Co., Ltd. (Bureau of Danjiangkou Hydropower Complex Management)
Yangtze River Engineering Consulting Company

References

External links
 The official website of Changjiang Water Resources Commission

Water resource management in China